The Old Mill Pond is a 1936 American animated short film in the Happy Harmonies series, directed by Hugh Harman for the Metro-Goldwyn-Mayer cartoon studio.

The short was nominated at the 1936 Academy Awards for Academy Award for Best Animated Short Film but lost to Disney's Silly Symphony short, The Country Cousin.

Summary
Fish and frogs gather at a pond. The performers are caricatures of Cab Calloway, Fats Waller, 'Bill "Bojangles' Robinson', Louis Armstrong, Stepin Fetchit, Ethel Waters and The Mills Brothers.

Sequel
The Old Mill Pond has followed by sequel, Swing Wedding in 1938.

Reception
The Film Daily (May 13, 1936): "This musical comedy cartoon is a knockout. Following the opening, which is the song "Down by the Old Mill Stream", the impersonations are Cab Calloway and his band doing "Minnie the Moocher" routine, "Fats" Waller doing his piano number, Bill Robinson his taps, the Mills Bros. their "Hold That Tiger", Stepin Fechit is presented, and a dancing chorus does "Jungle Rhythm". The Technicolor is beautiful, especially in the water numbers. This short is just one load of entertainment all the way through."

The Film Daily (June 1, 1936): "In Technicolor, a swell interpretation by the frogs in the millpond of the famous colored artists of tap dance and orchestra. The leading lights among the colored entertainers are presented in fine imitations, the technique is very clever, and the entire production a real novelty in cartoon with beautiful color and catchy music."

References

External links 
 
 

1936 films
1936 animated films
1936 short films
1930s animated short films
1930s color films
Metro-Goldwyn-Mayer films
Films directed by Hugh Harman
Metro-Goldwyn-Mayer animated short films
1930s American animated films
Films scored by Scott Bradley
Happy Harmonies
Cultural depictions of Fats Waller
Cultural depictions of Cab Calloway
Cultural depictions of Louis Armstrong